The Vijay for Best Supporting Actress is given by STAR Vijay as part of its annual Vijay Awards ceremony for Tamil  (Kollywood) films.

The list
Here is a list of the award winners and the films for which they won.

Nominations
2007 Sujatha Sivakumar - Paruthiveeran
Hemalatha - Kalloori
Khushbu - Periyar
Swarnamalya - Mozhi
Nadiya Moidu - Thamirabharani
2008 Simran - Vaaranam Aayiram
Aishwarya - Abhiyum Naanum 
Lekha Washington - Jayamkondaan
Saranya Mohan - Yaaradi Nee Mohini
2009 Abhinaya - Naadodigal
Madhumitha - Yogi
Sanjana Singh - Renigunta
Senthi Kumari - Pasanga
Sriya Reddy - Kanchivaram
2010 Saranya Ponvannan - Thenmerku Paruvakaatru
Susan George - Mynaa
Snigdha Akolkar - Nandalala
Abirami - Angadi Theru
Sangeetha - Manmadan Ambu
2011 Uma Riaz - Mounaguru
Ananya - Engaeyum Eppothum
Lakshmy Ramakrishnan - Yuddham Sei
Piaa Bajpai - Ko
Vasundhara - Poraali
 2012 Anupama Kumar - Muppozhudhum Un Karpanaigal
Nandita Das  - Neerparavai
Radhika Apte - Dhoni
Saranya Ponvannan - Oru Kal Oru Kannadi
Vidyullekha Raman - Neethane En Ponvasantham
 2013 Dhansika - Paradesi
 Nandita Swetha - Ethir Neechal
 Andrea Jeremiah - Vishwaroopam
 Tulasi - Aadhalal Kadhal Seiveer
 Viji Chandrasekhar - Madha Yaanai Koottam
 2014 Seetha - Goli Soda
Kovai Sarala - Aranmanai
Riythvika - Madras
Saranya Ponvannan - Velaiyilla Pattathari
Suhasini Mani Ratnam - Ramanujan

See also
 Tamil cinema
 Cinema of India

References

Supporting Actress
Film awards for supporting actress